The United States Department of Defense acknowledges holding four Kazakh detainees in Guantanamo.
A total of 778 detainees have been held in extrajudicial detention in the Guantanamo Bay detention camps, in Cuba since the camps opened on January 11, 2002.
The camp population peaked in 2004 at approximately 660.  Only nineteen new detainees, all "high value detainees" have been transferred there since the United States Supreme Court's ruling in Rasul v. Bush.  As of January 2008, the camp population stand at approximately 285.

Release negotiations
Kazakhstan's First Deputy Foreign Minister Kairat Abuseitov confirmed, on January 16, 2003, that Kazakh security officials had interviewed two Kazakhstan citizens in Guantanamo.
He described the two detainees as "young", and stated that Kazakhstan had appealed to the USA for their release.

In November 2003, the Central Asia Caucasus Institute Analyst reported that
Kazakh Foreign Minister Qasymzhomart Toqaev
Kazakhstan had been negotiated with the USA for the release of its citizens.
The Minister stated:

Kazakh detainees in Guantanamo

Ambassador Ordway's 22 May 2007 press briefing
American ambassador John M. Ordway addressed the Kazakhstani detainees in Guantanamo during a May 22, 2007, press briefing at the Kazakhstani Press Club.
Ordway confirmed that one detainee the USA considered a citizen of Kazakhstan remained in Guantanamo.
He stated that it was against US policy to compensate former detainees.
He asserted detainees were not detained any longer than necessary for US national security.

October 2008 repatriation
On October 31, 2008, the Department of Defense announced two detainees were repatriated to Kazakhstan and Tajikistan.
The DoD withheld the two men's names.

References

Lists of Guantanamo Bay detainees by nationality
Kazakhstan–United States relations